The 1947 Army Cadets football team was an American football team that represented the United States Military Academy as an independent during the 1947 college football season. In its seventh year under head coach Earl Blaik, the team compiled a 5–2–2 record, was ranked No. 11 in the final AP Poll, and outscored opponents by a total of 220 to 68. The team played its home games at Michie Stadium in West Point, New York.

Army's loss to Columbia on October 25, 1947, broke the Cadets' 32-game unbeaten streak dating back to November 1943.

Army guard Joe Steffy was selected by the Football Writers Association of America as the 1947 recipient of the Outland Trophy as the best guard or tackle in the country. Steffy was also a consensus first-team pick for the 1947 All-America team, and he was later inducted into the College Football Hall of Fame.  Steffy and Army fullback Elwyn "Rip" Rowan received first-team honors on the International News Service's 1947 All-East team.

Schedule

Roster
 Bill Gustafson - quarterback
 Elwyn "Rip" Rowan - fullback
 Winfield W. Scott Jr. - halfback
 Joe Steffy - guard
 Bill Yeoman - center

References

Army
Army Black Knights football seasons
Army Cadets football